Idioteuthis hjorti is a species of whip-lash squid.

References

External links

Tree of Life web project: Idioteuthis hjorti

Whip-lash squid
Taxa named by Carl Chun